Emoia atrocostata, commonly known as the littoral whiptail-skink, mangrove skink, or littoral skink, is a species of lizard in the family Scincidae. It inhabits mangroves, back-beach vegetation and rocky shorelines. It is semi-aquatic and forages in tidal pools.

Description
The species can be distinguished from the similar many-lined sun skink by the lack of keeled scales on the dorsal surface of the Mangrove Skink.  Its colour is grey or brown-grey, flecked with black. There is a faint black band along each side. The throat is often bluish, and the belly greenish or yellow to orange.

Distribution
E. atrocostata can be found on the Ryukyu Islands, Taiwan, the Philippines, Indonesia, Malaysia, Vietnam, Papua New Guinea, the Solomon Islands, Vanuatu and in Queensland, Australia.

Notes

References
 Duméril & Bibron, 1839 : Erpétologie Générale ou Histoire Naturelle Complète des Reptiles. , Roret/Fain et Thunot, Paris,  (full text).
 Lesson, 1830 : Description de quelques reptiles nouveaux ou peu connus. Voyage Autour du Monde Execute par Ordre du Roi, sur la Corvette de La Majeste, La Coquille, exécuté Pendant les Annees 1822, 1823, 1824 et 1825, Arthur Bertrand, Paris.

Emoia
Reptiles described in 1830
Skinks of Australia
Taxa named by René Lesson